Dan Hong (born 1982) is an Australian chef, restaurateur and television host. He is the executive chef at a number of restaurants under the Merivale company.

Early life
Hong's parents were born in Vietnam. His mother Angie came to Australia under the Colombo Plan to study chemical engineering. His father was a postgraduate electrical engineering student. They subsequently opened a number of Vietnamese restaurants in Sydney called Thanh Binh.

Hong attended Epping West Public School and Barker College but showed little interest in schooling. After attending a cooking school in Chatswood, Hong undertook a traineeship at the InterContinental Hotel and went on to an apprenticeship at Longrain, Pello Restaurant and Marque.

Career
Once qualified, Hong joined Tetsuya's as chef de partie followed by Bentley Restaurant and Bar as sous chef. After working with Wylie Dufresne at wd~50 in New York, he joined Lotus as head chef.

In 2008, Hong won the Josephine Pignolet Young Chef of the Year Award.

Hong is the executive chef at a number of restaurants, including Ms G's, Mr Wong, Papi Chulo and El Loco. Mr. Wong has won multiple awards and hats.

In 2016, Hong was the host of ABC iView series Shelfie which followed him as he ventured inside the kitchens of everyday Australians. Together with Melissa Leong and Mark Olive, Hong is a co-host and judge of the Australian television cooking competition The Chefs' Line. In August 2022 SBS Food screened The Streets with Dan Hong in which he explores street food from around the world.

Publications

References

Further reading
High school dropout to high-flyer: How chef Dan Hong found his groove, Good Food, 28 May 2018
Sydney native and Ms. G’s chef Dan Hong on his hometown favorites, Eats Abroad, 24 February 2016

Australian chefs
Australian television presenters
Living people
1982 births
People educated at Barker College
Australian people of Vietnamese descent